Prurigo gestationis is an eruption consisting of pruritic, excoriated papules of the proximal limbs and upper trunk, most often occurring between the 20th and 34th week of gestation.

The exact etiology is unknown, but it is considered likely to be a flareup of atopic dermatitis during pregnancy.

It is sometimes considered to be a term encompassing Besnier's prurigo gestationis and other conditions.

It is sometimes considered a diagnosis of exclusion.

See also 
 Dermatoses of pregnancy
 Ernest Henri Besnier
 List of cutaneous conditions

References 

Pregnancy-related cutaneous conditions
Pathology of pregnancy, childbirth and the puerperium